Julien Depuychaffray (6 March 1907 – 8 October 1942) was a French wrestler. He competed in the men's freestyle bantamweight at the 1932 Summer Olympics.

References

External links
 

1907 births
1942 deaths
French male sport wrestlers
Olympic wrestlers of France
Wrestlers at the 1932 Summer Olympics
Sportspeople from Yvelines